First Northern Bank is a community bank with headquarters in Dixon, California, United States founded in 1910.  The bank serves Solano, Yolo, Sacramento, Placer and El Dorado counties with ten full service branches.

The Bank's portfolio of loan includes commercial loans, agriculture loans, real estate mortgage loans, and real estate construction loans. Its primary lending focus is on commercial (including agricultural), construction and real estate mortgage.

FDIC Insured since January 1, 1934

One of only 10 banks in California over 100 years old.

History

First Northern Bank opened for business on February 1, 1910.   On January 20 of that year, 25 men and women organized the state-chartered savings bank, Northern Solano Bank.   Henry R. Timm of Dixon was elected the first president of the newly organized Northern Solano Bank.

On January 2, 1912, the Bank received approval of its application to establish the First National Bank of Dixon, a commercial bank.   In 1954, the Comptroller of the Currency gave final approval to consolidate First National Bank and Northern Solano Bank into the First National Bank of Dixon, effective as of the close of business Friday, April 8, 1955.   On January l, 1980, the Federal Charter was relinquished in favor of a State Charter, and the Bank's name was changed to First Northern Bank of Dixon.

In 2008, First Northern Bank begun its large project of installing 1,675 photovoltaic solar panels (26,767 sq ft, more than half an acre total) atop four of their bank buildings. Combined, these systems have a generating capacity of approximately 296 kilowatts of electricity.

Locations
California

  Auburn Financial Center
  Davis Financial Center
  Dixon Financial Center
  Fairfield Financial Center
Rancho Cordova (Opening 2019)
  Roseville Financial Center
 Sacramento Financial Center
  Vacaville Financial Center
  Walnut Creek 
  West Sacramento Financial Center
  Winters Branch
  Woodland Branch

Key dates

  1910: Opened for business in Dixon, CA as a state-chartered savings bank, Northern Solano Bank.
  1980: In order to reduce Federal Reserve requirements and operate with higher lending limits, the Federal Charter was relinquished in favor of a State Charter, and the Bank's name was changed to First Northern Bank of Dixon.
  1993: A new 33,000 sq. ft. Operations Center was built in Dixon, Ca.
  2000: The Board of Directors unanimously voted in favor of creating a bank holding company—First Northern Community Bancorp.
  2002: The Bank received its Trust Powers from the California Department of Financial Institutions and FDIC. The Asset Management & Trust Department opened for business.
  2010: First Northern Bank celebrated its first 100 years in business.
  2013: The Bank expanded into neighboring Contra Costa County with a loan production office in Walnut Creek.

References

External links
 Official site

Banks based in California
Companies traded over-the-counter in the United States